Mubarak Shah may refer to the following people:

 Mubarak Shah (Chagatai Khan), head of the Chagatai Khanate (1252–1260)
 Qutbuddin Mubarak Shah, Khalji dynasty, Delhi Sultanate (d. 1320)
 Fakhruddin Mubarak Shah, Bengal
 Mubarak Shah (Sayyid dynasty), Delhi Sultanate
 Mubarak Shah (athlete),  Pakistani long-distance runner